Ghanau  is a village located in the sidhmukh tahsil and Churu district of Rajasthan state in India. 

Ghanau